Abacetus monardianus is a species of ground beetle in the subfamily Pterostichinae. It was described by Stefano Ludovico Straneo in 1952.

References

monardianus
Beetles described in 1952